Lac de Pierre-Châtel is a lake between Pierre-Châtel and Saint-Théoffrey in the Isère department of France. Its surface area is 1.4 km².

In the North are the Lac de Pétichet and the Grand lac de Laffrey.

External links
  

Pierre Chatel, Lac